Cronulla is an electoral district of the Legislative Assembly in the Australian state of New South Wales. It is represented by Mark Speakman of the Liberal Party.

Members for Cronulla

Election results

References

External links

Cronulla